Jean Benner-Fries, also known as Jean Benner and Jean Benner the elder (1796–1849), was a French painter and textile designer.

Early life
He was born in 1764 Mulhouse, Haut-Rhin, Alsace, or, by other accounts, in Staufen, Switzerland (until 1798, Mulhouse was an independent Republic with stronger ties to Switzerland than to France.)

Career
Benner-Fries was a naturalist painter, with exotic flowers being his preferred subject.
Throughout his life, he worked in Paris and England, but was most active in his native town of Mulhouse, where the Musée de l'impression sur étoffes contains many of his works. His works are held in the municipal museums of Mulhouse, Caen, Nice, Bale, Belfort, Bern, Châlons, Colmar, Douai, Le Havre, Limoux, Nantes, Paris, Pau and Strasbourg.

Personal life
Benner-Fries became the father of twin sons, Emmanuel and Jean Benner, themselves both painters, whose works were exhibited at the Paris Salon beginning in 1867.

References

19th-century French painters
French male painters
French designers
1796 births
1849 deaths
Painters from Alsace
19th-century French male artists
18th-century French male artists